Senator Childres may refer to:

Don C. Childers (born 1932), Florida State Senate
Greg Childers (fl. 2010s), Oklahoma State Senate
Lawrence Childers (born 1944), Missouri State Senate
W. D. Childers (born 1933), Florida State Senate